Ellon Rugby Football Club are a rugby union side based in Ellon, Aberdeenshire.

History
The team was established in 1977 and play their home games at The Meadows. The club itself has a well established youth section with players ranging from 5 to 18 years regularly playing rugby.

The club has recently rebranded itself as Ellon Rugby.

Seasons
For the 2018/19 season, Ellon will compete in BT Caledonian Div 1.  Youth sides will compete in the rebranded Lancer Conference.

Ellon Golden Oldies side are the 2017 hosts for the 9th Scottish Golden Oldies Festival to be held on 6 May.

They won the BT Bowl in 2002 and reached the final of the BT Shield in 2006.

2012/13 season
Competitions: RBS Caledonia Division 1 & RBS Shield

Played 22, Won 10, Lost 12

Ellon lost the final of the RBS Caledonia Shield to Aberdeenshire.

RBS Caledonia League Division 1

2013/14 season

Competitions: RBS Caledonia Division 1 & RBS Shield

Played 19, Won 5, Lost 13, Drawn 1

Ellon were knocked out in the first round of the RBS Shield by Dunfermline.

RBS Caledonia League Division 1

2014/15 season

Competitions: BT Caledonia Division 1 & BT Shield

Ellon were knocked out in the first round of the BT Shield by Glenrothes.

2015/16 season

Competitions: BT Caledonia Division 2 (North) & BT Shield

Played 17, Won 4, Lost 13

Pretty much a season to start rebuilding the squad with a number of departures after getting relegated from Div 1.  More further away travel required than the 1XV had previously been used to with travel to Shetland and Stornoway.

Ellon were knocked out in the first round of the BT Shield by Dunfermline.

BT Caledonia League Division 2 North (North)

2016/17 season

Competitions: BT Caledonia Division 2 (North) & BT Bowl

Played 16, Won 9, Lost 6

With 12 teams entered into Caledonia Div 2 North, it was decided to split then into two leagues, East and West.  Once each league played each other home and away, the top 3 of each will play each other for promotion and the bottom 3 of each will play each other for relegation.  Any points earned from the other two from the original league were carried over.  Ellon played in the East league the first half of the season.

Ellon eventually withdraw from the BT Bowl in the second round.

BT Caledonia League Division 2 North (East)

BT Caledonia League Division 2 North (Bottom)

2017/18 season
Competitions: BT Caledonia Division 2 (North) & BT Bowl

Played 23, Won 17, Lost 6

Although eventually finishing 2nd in the league, ended up gaining promotion after no team were relegated from National 3 and the 2nd placed team in Caledonia Div 2 (Midlands) declined a playoff.

Ellon were knocked out in the semi finals of the Caledonia Bowl against Aberdeen University.

RAF Lossiemouth withdrew from league due to operational reasons.
Aberdeen Uni Medics removed from league for failing to fulfil fixtures.

Notable former players

Scotland internationalists

The following former Ellon players have represented Scotland at full international level.

Glasgow Warriors players

The following former Ellon players have represented Glasgow Warriors at professional level.

References

Scottish rugby union teams